Wang Jianan (born 27 August 1996) is a Chinese track and field athlete who competes in the long jump.

He competed in a heptathlon and a decathlon in 2012 but showed his aptitude for the long jump by winning at the Chinese Athletics Championships. One month after turning sixteen he jumped a personal best of 8.04 m to claim the national title.

He quickly rose to the top of the regional scene with a gold medal win at the 2013 Asian Athletics Championships.

In 2018, Wang won the gold medal in long jump at the 18th Asian Games in Jakarta, Indonesia.
On 16 June 2018, he equalled the national record in Guiyang with his personal best of 8.47 m.

In 2022, he became world champion in long jump.

Statistics
Information from World Athletics profile unless otherwise noted.

Personal bests

References

External links
 
 
 
 
 

Living people
1996 births
Chinese male long jumpers
Olympic athletes of China
Athletes (track and field) at the 2016 Summer Olympics
World Athletics Championships athletes for China
World Athletics Championships medalists
Asian Games gold medalists for China
Asian Games medalists in athletics (track and field)
Athletes (track and field) at the 2018 Asian Games
Medalists at the 2018 Asian Games
Asian Games gold medalists in athletics (track and field)
Athletes (track and field) at the 2020 Summer Olympics
21st-century Chinese people